The Agustín Melgar Olympic Velodrome is a velodrome located in the Magdalena Mixhuca Sports City sports complex located in Mexico City, Mexico.

History
It hosted the track cycling events for the 1968 Summer Olympics. it was also used by many cyclists who attempted to break the world hour record. The record was broken 39 times at the velodrome, including one by Eddy Merckx.

The facility holds 6,400 people and the infield is synthetic turf lined for both association football and small-sized American football games.

References

1968 Summer Olympics official report. Volume 2. Part 1. p. 74.
Mexico City profile. 

Venues of the 1968 Summer Olympics
Sports venues in Mexico City
Velodromes in Mexico
Olympic cycling venues